Rolf Hoppe (6 December 1930 – 14 November 2018) was a prolific German stage, cinema, and television actor, who played in more than 400 films in a career which spanned over six decades.

To international audiences Hoppe is perhaps best known for his roles as the General in the Oscar-winning Mephisto (1981) and as the King in the East-German–Czechoslovakian Holiday classic Three Gifts for Cinderella (1973).

Early life 

Hoppe was born the son of a master baker in Ellrich, Thuringia, Germany. After his apprenticeship as a baker, he worked from 1945 to 1948 as a coach driver.

Career 

Hoppe moved to Erfurt where he began formal training as an actor at the Staatliches Konservatorium from 1949 to 1951, during which time he supported himself by working as an animal handler at the Zirkus Aeros. He later performed at Thalia Theater in Halle (Saale) and at the Theater der jungen Welt (children's and youth theatre) in Leipzig. 
His stage performances included such notable venues as the Staatsschauspiel Dresden, the Deutsches Theater in Berlin, and the Salzburg Festival. Internationally, he worked in Switzerland, Italy, Poland and China.

In the East German DEFA movies, Hoppe frequently played villains in different Osterns ("Red Westerns") of the 1960s and 1970s. In the 1973 fairytale film Tři oříšky pro Popelku / Drei Haselnüße für Aschenbrödel ("Three Wishes for Cinderella"), a Czechoslovakian–East German co-production, he appeared as the King. One of Hoppe's most notable roles is that of "the General" (based on Hermann Göring) in István Szabó's  drama Mephisto, which was awarded the 1981 Academy Award for Best Foreign Language Film. In Peter Schamoni's historical drama Spring Symphony, he played Friedrich Wieck, the strict piano teacher of Robert Schumann and father of Clara Wieck.

In addition to numerous appearances in feature films and television productions, Hoppe also worked as a voice-artist in children's radio plays and audio-books, such as the German version of Alice in Wonderland where he provided the voice of the White Rabbit.

Private life and death 

Hoppe died 14 November 2018 in Dresden, where he lived in the suburb of Weißig. He was interred in the Waldfriedhof Weisser Hirsch (cemetery), Dresden; and survived by his wife Friederike with whom he had two daughters: Josephine and Christine Hoppe, the latter who is also an actress. His grandson Oscar Hoppe is an actor as well.

Selected filmography 

1963: Jetzt und in der Stunde meines Todes, as Portier
1965: Solange Leben in mir ist, as Abgeordneter
1965: Die besten Jahre, as Lehrer Klein
1965: Der Frühling braucht Zeit, as Rudi Wiesen
1965: , as Lehrer Eiffler
1966: Fräulein Schmetterling, as Himmelblau
1967: Frau Venus und ihr Teufel, as Siegfried
1968: I Was Nineteen, as Major Behring
1968: Die Nacht im Grenzwald, as Bennigsen
1968: Spur des Falken, as Bashan
1968: Hauptmann Florian von der Mühle, as Polizeidirektor
1968: Mohr und die Raben von London, as Bankier
1968–1970: Ich – Axel Cäsar Springer (TV series)
1969: Lebende Ware, as Grabau
1969: Jungfer, Sie gefällt mir, as Reitender Bote
1969: Nebelnacht, as Herr Kranepuhl
1969: Weiße Wölfe, as James Bashan
1970: Tödlicher Irrtum, as Allison
1970: Jeder stirbt für sich allein (TV Mini-Series)
1971: Männer ohne Bart, as Gangster
1971: Goya or the Hard Way to Enlightenment, as Charles IV of Spain
1971–1973: Die Brüder Lautensack (TV miniseries)
1972: Leichensache Zernik, as Werner W. Bergmann
1972: The Stolen Battle, as Josef Barody
1972: Eolomea, as Prof. Oli Tal
1973: Das zweite Leben des Friedrich Wilhelm Georg Platow, as Dr. Hoppe
1973: Apachen, as Captain Burton
1973: Susanne und der Zauberring, as Schleusenwärter
1973: Die Hosen des Ritters von Bredow, as Ritter Götz von Bredow
1973: Tři oříšky pro Popelku (Drei Haselnüsse für Aschenbrödel), as King
1973: Die Zwillinge (TV Movie), as Generaldirektor Beißer
1974: Orpheus in der Unterwelt, as Jupiter
1974: Leben mit Uwe, as Dr. Bohnsack
1974: Der nackte Mann auf dem Sportplatz, as Tautz
1974: Für die Liebe noch zu mager, as Onkel Carlo
1974: Ulzana, as Captain Burton
1974: Wie füttert man einen Esel, as Otto-Ernst Schuster
1974: Hans Röckle und der Teufel, as Meister Hans Röckle
1974: Johannes Kepler, as Emperor Rudolf II
1974: , as Shorty
1975: Between Day and Night
1975: Die Bösewichter müssen dran, as Christian
1975: Ikarus, as Brigadier
1975–1996: Polizeiruf 110: Die Rechnung geht nicht auf (TV Series), as Goertz / Hopfer / Paul Kramer
1976: Daniel Druskat (TV Mini-Series), as Herr Mühlstädt
1976: Das Licht auf dem Galgen, as Pfarrer Clark
1976: Unser stiller Mann, as Schuster
1976: Beethoven – Tage aus einem Leben, as Ignaz Schuppanzigh
1977: Zur See (TV Series), as Havarie-Kapitän Topf
1977: Unterwegs nach Atlantis, as Alexander Grey
1977: Die Flucht, as Der Runde
1977–1979: Das unsichtbare Visier (TV Series)
1978: Jörg Ratgeb – Maler, as Gaukler
1978: Sabine Wulff, as Professor
1978: Fleur Lafontaine, as Bullklein
1978: Volpone (TV Movie), as Volpone
1978: Ein Sonntagskind, das manchmal spinnt, as Lehrer Schütterow
1979: Schatzsucher, as Blinder
1980: Komödianten-Emil, as Kommissar
1980: Yunost Petra
1980: Levins Mühle, as Froese
1980: Heute abend und morgen früh
1981: Mephisto, as Tábornagy
1981: Pugowitza, as Hopf
1981: Feuerdrachen (TV Series), as Solka
1982: Rächer, Retter und Rapiere (TV Series), as Heinrich von Müffling
1982: Die Gerechten von Kummerow, as Superintendent
1982: Der lange Ritt zur Schule, as Trapper
1982: Sonjas Rapport
1982: Bahnwärter Thiel (TV Movie), as Pfarrer
1983: Spring Symphony, as Friedrich Wieck
1983: Mein Vater ist ein Dieb
1983: Martin Luther (TV Series)
1983–1985: Der Staatsanwalt hat das Wort (TV Series), as Clemens Gerlach / Tristan
1984: Woman Doctors, as Dr. Böblinger
1984: Wer war Edgar Allan? (TV Movie), as Edgar Allan
1985: Irrläufer (TV Movie), as Bergmann
1985: , as Gefängnisdirektor
1985: 
1985: Kaiser und eine Nacht, as Eddie
1985: Besuch bei Van Gogh, as Amadeus Bergk
1985: Die Gänse von Bützow, as Dr. Hane
1985: Sachsens Glanz und Preußens Gloria (TV Series), as Augustus III
1986: The House on the River, as Director Hüsgen
1986: Der Nachbar, as Georg Walz
1986:  (TV Movie)
1987: , as Duke Ernest II
1987: Liane, as Jürgens Vater
1987: Magnat, as Heinberg
1987: The Tribulations of a Chinese Gentleman
1988: Melanios letzte Liebe (TV Movie), as Melanio Altolaguirre
1988: Zimmer 36
1989: , as Bruno Markward
1989: Pestalozzi's Mountain, as Zehender
1989: , as Hart
1989: The Dancing Girl (舞姫), as Robert Koch
1989: Ein brauchbarer Mann, as Heiner Rudolf
1990: Kohl – ein deutscher Politiker
1991: Das Licht der Liebe
1991:  (TV Movie), as Otto Hahn
1991: , as Gefangener
1992: Die Männer vom K3 (TV Series), as Adolf Buchegger
1992: Schtonk!, as Karl Lentz
1992: Night on Fire, as Tobler
1992: The Democratic Terrorist, as Lodge Hecht
1992:  (TV Movie), as Friedrich
1993: Durchreise – Die Geschichte einer Firma (TV Mini-Series)
1993: Die Lok, as Hans Kastler
1993–2000: Das Traumschiff (TV Series), as Kommisar Franz Engel / Kurt Steiner
1993–1999: Rosamunde Pilcher (TV Series), as Peter Green / Grenville Bayliss
1994: , as Gemeindepräsident Mathis
1994: Mario and the Magician, as Prefecto Angiolieri
1994–2003: Tatort' (TV Series), as Dr. Paul Knödgen / Karsunke / Mr. Sudhoff / Walter Severing / Karl Ammond / Tauber
1995: La piovra,  (TV Mini-Series), as Professor Ramonte
1995:  (TV Movie), as Theo Krautinger
1995:  (TV Movie), as Senft
1995: Inspector Rex (TV Series), as Erich Staller
1997: Geisterstunde – Fahrstuhl ins Jenseits (TV Movie), as Frank
1997: Lorenz im Land der Lügner, as König
1997: Der Hauptmann von Köpenick (TV Movie), as Zuchthausdirektor
1997: Comedian Harmonists, as Gauleiter Streicher
1997: Die Healthy, as Georg Mosbacher
1997: Reise in die Dunkelheit (TV Movie)
1998: Palmetto, as Felix Malroux
1998: Sugar for the Beast (TV Movie), as Prof. Weihrauch
1998: One Step Too Far (TV Movie), as Anwalt Bornstein
1999: Hans im Glück, as Reiter
1999: Klemperer – Ein Leben in Deutschland (TV Series), as Opa Findeisen
2000: Am Ende siegt die Liebe (TV Movie), as Max Sander
2000: Models (TV Movie), as Berhard Rief
2001: Die Verbrechen des Professor Capellari (TV Series), as Dr. Walter Schneider
2001: Der Bulle von Tölz (TV Series), as Dr. Berthold Schwaninger
2001–2006: SOKO Kitzbühel (TV Series), as Manninger / Santigo / Konsul Tichalski
2002: Der letzte Zeuge (TV Series), as Josef Karzmann
2002:  (TV Movie), as Johann Kirnberger
2004: Wilsberg (TV Series), as Erwin Kuhn
2004: Donna Leon (TV Series), as Gabriele Cossato
2004: Am Kap der Liebe (TV Movie), as Ferdinand Hansen / Paul Freeman
2005: Alles auf Zucker!, as Rabbi Ginsberg
2007: Giganten (TV Series), as Johann Wolfgang von Goethe
2007: SOKO Rhein-Main (TV Series), as Rosenbaum
2007: Mein alter Freund Fritz2007–2009: Commissario Laurenti (TV Series), as Galvano
2008: Der Besuch der alten Dame (TV Movie), as Georg Riemann
2009: Swinki, as Weber
2009: So ein Schlamassel (TV Movie), as Mosche 'Zaide' Pulver
2009: Eine Liebe in Petersburg (TV Movie), as Grischa
2010: Küstenwache (TV Series), as Gunther Breitscheid
2011: Bittere Kirschen2011: Linda geht tanzen (TV Movie), as Wilhelm Hessler
2012: , as Oberst Seler
2013: Die letzte Instanz (TV Movie), as Otmar Koplin
2014: Ohne Dich, as Hans
2016: Die Blumen von gestern, as Professor Norkus

 Discography 
 2010: Hoppe spricht Schöne Frühlingslieder

 Awards 
 1971: National Prize of East Germany 1. class for art and literature
 1981: Critics Award of the Hungarian Journalist. Association for his role in Mephisto 1995: Lessing Prize of the Free State of Saxony
 1998: Grimme-Preis for his role in the TV miniseries Sardsch 2005: Goldene Henne for his lifetime achievement
 2007: Art Award, City of Dresden
 2010: Order of Merit of the Federal Republic of Germany, 1st Class

 References 

 Further reading 
 Eberhard Görner: Der Schauspieler Rolf Hoppe''. Henschel, 1996,

External links 
 
 Rolf Hoppe at dreihaselnuessefueraschenbroedel.de 
 Rolf Hoppe at DEFA-Sternstunden 

1930 births
2018 deaths
People from Nordhausen (district)
German male film actors
German male stage actors
German male television actors
20th-century German male actors
21st-century German male actors
Recipients of the National Prize of East Germany
Officers Crosses of the Order of Merit of the Federal Republic of Germany